Gökhan S. Hotamisligil (born June 24, 1962) is a Turkish-American physician scientist; James Stevens Simmons Chair of Genetics and Metabolism at Harvard T.H. Chan School of Public Health (HSPH); Director of the Sabri Ülker Center for Metabolic Research and associate member of Harvard-MIT Broad Institute, Harvard Stem Cell Institute and the Joslin Diabetes Center.

Hotamisligil has been a pioneer in research efforts to explain the mechanistic basis of common chronic metabolic diseases; particularly obesity, diabetes, fatty liver disease, and atherosclerosis. His work has led to the emergence of novel concepts that have altered the understanding of metabolic disease pathogenesis.

Biography 
Gökhan Hotamisligil was born in Rize,  Turkey and after attending elementary schools in Vakfikebir, Turgutlu, and Gediz; he graduated from the public Ankara Atatürk Anadolu High School in 1980. He then received his degree in medicine from Ankara University Medical School in 1986 and his PhD from Harvard Medical School (HMS) in 1994. Hotamisligil joined the Harvard T.H. Chan School of Public Health (HSPH) as an assistant professor in the Department of Nutrition & Division of Biological Sciences. He was promoted to tenured professor in 2003. He founded the Department of Genetics & Complex Diseases in the same year and served as the chair of the department.

In 2014, the Sabri Ülker Center for Nutrient, Genetic, and Metabolic Research at HSPH was established by the Ülker family to honor their late father Sabri Ülker and to support the research in the laboratory of Hotamisligil. Dr. Hotamisligil is the founding Director of the Sabri Ülker Center at Harvard.

Hotamisligil has been recognized with many fellowships and awards over the course of his career. These include election as a fellow of the American Association for the Advancement of Science, the Naomi Berrie Award for Outstanding Achievement in Diabetes Research, the Outstanding Scientific Accomplishment Award from the American Diabetes Association, the Wertheimer Award for Outstanding Basic Research Contributions in the field of obesity from IASO, the Danone International Prize for Nutrition, and the Roy Greep Award for Outstanding Research from the Endocrine Society, EASD–Novo Nordisk Foundation Diabetes Prize for Excellence, among others.  He has also been the recipient of 2004 TUBITAK Science Award, Koç Science Award and elected member of the Turkish Academy of Sciences. He also serves as a member of the board of trustees of Kadir Has University.  Hotamisligil serves in many editorial boards including Science Translational Medicine, Cell Metabolism, EMBO molecular Medicine, Journal of Clinical Investigation, PlosBiology, and others.

Research 
Hotamisligil’s research efforts focus on the molecular and genetic basis of common and complex diseases, particularly obesity, diabetes, and heart disease. His research examines the mechanisms of nutrient sensing and response pathways as they relate to immune and metabolic homeostasis. Hotamisligil’s work has been instrumental in the emergence of the immunological basis of obesity and diabetes and the field of immunometabolism,,. Today obesity and diabetes are understood as states of chronic, low-grade, sustained, systemic and metabolically orchestrated inflammation; also known as “metaflammation,” a concept introduced by Hotamisligil; which underlies the pathogenesis of metabolic diseases.

In a 2002 paper, the Hotamisligil lab established a link between activation of the inflammatory and stress kinase JNK and consequent inhibition of insulin receptor signaling via phosphorylation of the insulin receptor substrate (IRS-1). Since then, his lab has identified multiple other significant molecules and pathways as key modulators of chronic metabolic inflammation, insulin sensitivity and glucose metabolism in obesity, including the double stranded RNA dependent protein kinase PKR and the transmembrane protein STAMP2.

The Hotamisligil lab also established the importance of organelle homeostasis in metabolic tissues and the role of organelle dysfunction in metabolic disease. In particular, they established that chronic endoplasmic reticulum (ER) dysfunction is a feature of metabolic tissues in obesity, linked to regulation of insulin action and glucose and lipid metabolism. In subsequent studies they showed that the increase in ER stress in the obese condition is in part related to defects in autophagy, the cellular recycling system, as well as changes in lipid metabolism and ER membrane composition and result in alterations ER calcium homeostasis. Recently, the Hotamisligil lab also delineated abnormal interactions between ER and mitochondria in the context of metabolic disease that result in aberrant calcium metabolism and mitochondrial dysfunction.

Hotamisligil lab integrates these cellular and molecular stress pathways to nutrients through their work in an integrated field on lipid trafficking and signaling with a focus on fatty acid binding proteins, de novo lipogenesis products.  In a 2008 paper, Hotamisligil lab described a lipid natured hormone, which they named as a “lipokine” and showed its beneficial actions on lipid and glucose metabolism.  In 2015, Hotamisligil lab described a novel hormone that is produced by the adipose tissue during fasting to regulate hepatic glucose production and pancreatic activity.  Therapeutic targeting of both of these molecules is pursued for the treatment of metabolic diseases. In a 2017 paper, Hotamisligil lab has identified a transcription factor, NRF1, that both senses and responds to excess cholesterol in the ER and acts together with SREBP2 as yin-yang to keep ER cholesterol levels within a safe, narrow range.

As of 2019, Hotamisligil has authored over 185 publications, which have received in excess of 85,000 citations and was named as an inventor on multiple patents. He has an h-index of 105. Hotamisligil has also been a mentor to many students and fellows who are now pursuing their independent scientific careers in many capacities around the world. He has been an advocate of science as a vehicle of diplomacy between cultures and delivered more than 300 lectures around the world.

Personal life 
Hotamisligil is married to Selen Ciliv, a physician scientist specialized in assisted infertility treatment technologies and clinical applications and a consultant to World Health Organization.  Their two children Leyla and Derin live in the United States and Canada. His late father Hulki Hotamisligil was a physician and mother Güner Hotamisligil was a teacher who served in remote regions of Turkey to support public health and education.

Selected awards 
1991 Lucille P. Markey Predoctoral Fellowship in Developmental Biology

1997 Pew Scholar in Biomedical Sciences, Pew Charitable Trusts

2004 Recipient of the Turkish Scientific and Research Council, TUBITAK Award

2007 Outstanding Scientific Accomplishment Award, American Diabetes Association

2009 Elected Fellow of American Association for Advancement of Science

2010 Wertheimer Award, International Association for the Study of Obesity

2010 Naomi Berrie Award for Outstanding Achievement in Diabetes Research

2012 Richard J. Havel Lecture

2013 Koç Foundation Science Award

2014 Danone International Prize for Nutrition

2015 Roy O. Greep Award for Outstanding Research, Endocrine Society

2017 Hans L. Falk Memorial Lecture

2018 EASD–Novo Nordisk Foundation Diabetes Prize for Excellence

External links 
Harvard page

References

Harvard School of Public Health faculty
Turkish geneticists
American people of Turkish descent
American geneticists
Ankara University alumni
1962 births
Harvard Medical School alumni
Living people
Fellows of the American Association for the Advancement of Science
People from Pazar, Rize